Agayakan (Agayakaan) is a rural locality (a selo), and one of four settlements in Second Borogonsky Rural Okrug of Oymyakonsky District in the Sakha Republic, Russia, in addition to Tomtor, the administrative center of the Rural Okrug, Aeroport and Kuydusun. Its population as of the 2002 Census was 0.

References

Notes

Sources
Official website of the Sakha Republic. Registry of the Administrative-Territorial Divisions of the Sakha Republic. Oymyakonsky District. 

Rural localities in Oymyakonsky District